The Pacific sanddab (Citharichthys sordidus) is a species of flatfish. It is by far the most common sanddab, and it shares its habitat with the longfin sanddab (C. xanthostigma) and the speckled sanddab (C. stigmaeus). It is a medium-sized flatfish, with a light brown color mottled brown or black, occasionally with white or orange spots.

The Pacific sanddab is endemic to the northern Pacific Ocean, from the Sea of Japan to the coast of California.

It is an opportunistic predator, feeding on a variety of crustaceans, as well as smaller fish, squid, and octopuses.

It is a popular game fish in northern California, found on menus in the Monterey Bay and San Francisco area, though more difficult to find in southern California restaurants and markets. Usually sold frozen, some regard it as a delicacy. It is also popular in restaurants and stores along the coasts of Oregon and Washington, where it can be found more readily.

References

Paralichthyidae
Fauna of the San Francisco Bay Area
Western North American coastal fauna
Fish described in 1854